Geumho is a town, or eup, in Yeongcheon, North Gyeongsang Province, South Korea. The township Geumho-myeon was upgraded to the town Geumho-eup in 1973. Geumho Town Office is located in Gyodae-ri, which is crowded with people.

Communities
Geumho-eup is divided into 21 villages (ri).

References

External links
Official website 

Yeongcheon
Towns and townships in North Gyeongsang Province